André Georges Richaume (8 February 1905 in Mirecourt – 31 March 1966 in Paris) was a prominent French bowmaker, from a family of bowmakers.

His grandfather was  Charles Claude Fetique (1853–1911), who was a violin maker,  and who had  two bow-making sons, Victor François Fétique (1872–1933) and Jules Fetique (1875–1951), and a daughter Marie Augustine Marthe Fétique (1879–1928 André's mother). André's cousin, Marcel Fétique (1899–1977 son of Victor), became a bowmaker as well.

Richaume apprenticed with Emile Francois Ouchard in Mirecourt, before joining his uncle, Victor Fetique in Paris. He established his own shop in 1923 and worked until 1957. In 1955 Richaume was awarded the distinction of "Meilleur Ouvrier de France" (one of the best craftsmen in France).

He supplied fine bows to other Parisian makers under his own brand. His work is very much influenced by  Ouchard and  his uncle Victor Fetique.

David Oistrakh used a Richaume bow in the later part of his life. Oistrakh had remarked that this bow gave him great satisfaction, so much so that when in Paris, he had to go meet Richaume in person. "The bow bought by his son Igor Oistrakh in 1957, had filled David with such enthusiasm that Igor made a gift of it."

"André Richaume was also a restorer  of very great talent, able to preserve the styles of the Masters of the past."

Quotes

"One of the great French bow makers of the 20th century". Christopher Brown 

"One of the most remarkable bow makers of his generation".  

"Superb maker in the finest tradition, whose work shows the influence of  Ouchard and Fetique. It is said that his best bows are from his mature period especially those mounted in gold." Gennady Filimonov

References

 
 
 
 Discovering bows for the Double Bass  1994 Beaux Arts Editions - Christopher Brown
 Dictionnaire Universel del Luthiers - Rene Vannes 1951,1972, 1985 (vol.3)
 Universal Dictionary of Violin & Bow Makers - William Henley 1970

1905 births
1966 deaths
Luthiers from Mirecourt
Bow makers